is a kind of jacket traditionally worn over a kimono. It later came to be worn by women.  are sleeveless and more likely to be worn by children, while sleeved  are more often worn by adults. Sleeveless  serve as smocks, protecting the clothing underneath, while sleeved  are more likely to be worn for warmth.

It is the origin of current kimono coat.

Structure

Its neckline is square with a flat collar, not a round collar. A  may be padded for extra warmth.

Gallery

See also
 
 
 
 Academic gown, a warm overgarment with a similar historic social role
 List of items traditionally worn in Japan

References

External links

Japanese upper-body garments
Folk costumes
Coats (clothing)